Germano Bollini (born 6 November 1951) is a Sammarinese sports shooter. He competed in the men's 50 metre free pistol event at the 1984 Summer Olympics.

References

1951 births
Living people
Sammarinese male sport shooters
Olympic shooters of San Marino
Shooters at the 1984 Summer Olympics
Place of birth missing (living people)